The 1924–25 season was the 28th in the history of the Western Football League.

This season was the last until the dawn of World War II in which the league consisted of a single division. The champions this season were Yeovil and Petters United. The previous season's runaway winners Lovells Athletic finished bottom of the table.

Final table
Three new clubs joined the league this season, and the number of clubs increased from eleven to thirteen after Cardiff Corinthians left the league.

Frome Town, rejoining after leaving the league in 1922.
Swindon Victoria
Welton Rovers, rejoining after leaving the league in 1923.

References

1924-25
1924–25 in Welsh football
1924–25 in English football leagues